Hawes Street station is a light rail surface stop on the MBTA Green Line C branch, located in the median of Beacon Street west of Hawes Street in Brookline, Massachusetts. The station consists of two side platforms which serve the C branch's two tracks. With 339 boardings on an average weekday in 2011, Hawes Street has the lowest ridership on the C branch and fourth-lowest on the entire Green Line.

Track work in 2018–19, which included replacement of platform edges at several stops, triggered requirements for accessibility modifications at those stops. By December 2022, design for Hawes Street and seven other C Branch stations was 15% complete, with construction expected to take place in 2024.

References

External links

MBTA - Hawes Street
 Station from Hawes Street from Google Maps Street View

Green Line (MBTA) stations
Railway stations in Brookline, Massachusetts